Postal codes in Azerbaijan consist of four digits.  

The four-digit postcode indicates the nationwide format AZ NNNN. The first two digits indicate the regions of Azerbaijan in accordance with the modern administrative divisions, including the Nakhchivan Autonomous Republic and Nagorno-Karabakh.

History 
From 1970 until 1991, when Azerbaijan was part of the Soviet Union as the Azerbaijan SSR, the entire territory of the Soviet Union used the six-digit postcode 37NNNN. After gaining independence, Azerbaijan switched to the current four-digit postcode.

See also 
 Postal code
 Azərpoçt
 Telephone numbers in Azerbaijan
 ISO 3166-2:AZ
 Administrative divisions of Azerbaijan 
Postage stamps and postal history of Azerbaijan

References

External links
 
 

Azerbaijan
Postal codes
Postal system of Azerbaijan